The Governor's Academy is an independent school north of Boston located on  in the village of Byfield, Massachusetts, United States (town of Newbury),  north of Boston. The Academy enrolls approximately 412 students in grades nine through twelve, 70% of whom are boarders. The school was established in 1763 and is the oldest continuously operating independent boarding school in the United States.

History

The school was founded two years after the death of William Dummer, who funded it in his will. Dummer had been lieutenant governor and acting governor of Massachusetts for many years, and led the colony through a difficult period in the earlier 18th century: fighting off forays by French and Indians during what became known as Dummer's War in the 1720s. He also served as an early overseer of Harvard College. He was from a prominent colonial family with his brother Jeremiah Dummer having been a principal founding benefactor of the College of New Haven, which later became Yale University. As the Boston Latin School only accepted students from the city of Boston, the need arose for schools in more outlying areas to prepare students for college—the only ones existing at that time in New England being Harvard and Yale; Brown and Dartmouth were founded a few years afterward. In that context, the Dummer Charity School or Dummer Grammar School commenced operation in 1763 pursuant to the will of Governor Dummer with Samuel Moody as its first headmaster. In 1782, the Dummer school was officially incorporated as the Dummer Academy, whose graduates in this era comprised approximately 25% of the undergraduate student body at Harvard.  Most children in this era were home-schooled with pre-college education ending around the age of 14, with youths thereafter going on to college or entering the workforce. Thus most college freshmen tended to be the age of high school freshmen today.

As was the custom, the curriculum in this era focused primarily on the study of Scripture, basic math and English and, most importantly, instruction in Latin, Greek, and the Classics. The curriculum broadened over time as the requirements of college admission expanded. Although the academy initially operated in a one-room schoolhouse which still stands to this day, it had access to the grand mansion of the late governor, which remains a central fixture on the campus as the headmaster's residence. Over time other structures were built and the faculty and curriculum expanded so that by the time of the school's centennial in 1863, the Dummer Academy had grown into a well known 19th-century prep school that catered mostly to children from affluent families who aspired to the Ivy League. By the turn of the 20th century, however, the school had fallen on hard times, with enrollment and income down, as the school struggled under the shadow of Andover and Exeter, and other schools that had grown to become very well known and prestigious.  It was in this context that Dr. Charles Ingham became headmaster in 1908, launching great efforts to revive the Academy. As a result, Dummer Academy became stabilized and began to again thrive as a premier New England prep school that sent over a third of its graduates to Ivy League colleges during that period. Upon Dr. Ingham's retirement in 1930, Edward "Ted" Eames became headmaster, a post he held for 30 years. Early in Master Eames' tenure, the name of the school was changed to the Governor Dummer Academy, a title it retained until 2006.

With some exceptions, the school primarily was open only to boys until coeducation was established in 1972.

Name change
In December 2005, the Board of Trustees voted to change the name of the Academy to "The Governor's Academy" amid concerns that the name "Dummer" was deterring prospective students from applying. Legally the name remains "Governor Dummer Academy" doing business as "The Governor's Academy." When founded, the Academy was named "Dummer Charity School." Subsequently, the name was changed to "Dummer Academy," which name it was known by for a century and a half.

The decision to change met with resistance from some students and alumni, and attracted media attention from around the country. Those who promoted the change saw it as one of a number of ways to expand the geographic representation and the overall appeal of the school, especially to those who were not familiar with the school or its history. The name change took effect on July 1, 2006. In 2010-2011, the Academy set records for admissions inquiries, interviews and applications, thus supporting the decision that the name change would enhance institutional marketing efforts.

Academics
Students study in small classes, with a student-to-teacher ratio of 5:1. Advanced Placement courses are offered in nearly 22 subjects, from mathematics and science to art, foreign languages, English and history. Foreign language classes are offered in Chinese, French, Spanish and Latin. Eighty-five percent of faculty live on campus and serve as dorm parents and coaches as well as classroom teachers. More than 70% have advanced degrees, with several having earned terminal degrees in science, law, education and medicine.

Athletics
The Academy is a member of the Independent School League. The school fields 23 varsity teams and 47 interscholastic teams. There are three levels of interscholastic competition offered at The Governor's Academy: varsity, junior varsity, and thirds. Governor's regularly competes with its rival Brooks School.

2002 – Boys' Lacrosse ISL Co-Champions
2004 – Football ISL Champions
2005 – Football ISL Champions
2006 – Boys' Lacrosse ISL Tri-Champions
2006 – Girls' Soccer ISL Champions
2006 – Softball ISL Champions
2007 – Boys' Lacrosse ISL Co-Champions
2008 – Girls' Ice Hockey New England Champions
2008 – Boys' Lacrosse ISL Champions (undefeated)
2008 – Girls' Softball ISL Champions
2008 – Golf ISL Champions
2008 – Girls' Cross Country ISL and New England Champions
2009 – Girls' Ice Hockey New England Champions
2009 – Boys' lacrosse Tri-ISL Champions
2009 – Field Hockey New England Champions
2009 – Girls' Cross Country New England Champions
2010 – Girls' Ice Hockey New England Champions
2011 – Girls' Ice Hockey New England Champions
2011 – Boys' Lacrosse ISL Champions (undefeated)
2011 – Girls' Softball ISL Champions
2011 – Football ISL/New England Champions (undefeated)
2011 – Girls' Soccer New England "Class B" Champions
2012 – Boys' Lacrosse Co-ISL Champions
2012 – Girls' Softball ISL Co-Champions
2012 – Football ISL/New England Champions (undefeated)
2012 – Girls' Soccer ISL/New England Champions (undefeated)
2013 – Boys' Baseball ISL Co-Champions
2013 – Girls' Softball ISL Champions (undefeated)
2013 – Football ISL Co-Champions/New England Champions
2014 – Football ISL Co-Champions
2015 – Girls' Field Hockey New England Champions
2015 – Girls' Softball ISL Champions (undefeated)
2015 – Boys' Lacrosse Co-ISL Champions
2016 – Girls' Field Hockey ISL Champions
2016 – Girls' Softball ISL Champions (undefeated)
2016 – Boys' Baseball ISL Co-Champions
2017 – Girls' Field Hockey ISL Champions
2017 – Girls' Field Hockey New England Champions
2018 – Boys' Lacrosse Co-ISL Champions
2022 – Boys' Football ISL Champions
2022 – Girls' Field Hockey New England Champions

Arts
Programs in visual and performing arts are offered in the Kaiser Art Center and the Wilkie Performing Arts Center. Kaiser has studios for photography and film, ceramics, drawing, painting and design.  Wilkie has a 500-seat auditorium/theater, a black box, an art gallery, and a complete workshop for technical theater. The Academy has performed exceedingly well in recent Boston Globe Scholastic Art Awards competitions, ranking first in total awards in 2010 and second in 2011. In 2012, Academy students won 39 awards in the competition in 4 different art disciplines: ceramics, studio art, photography and film. Governor's artists won 15 Gold Keys, 10 Silver Keys, and 14 Honorable Mentions, making the Academy the most winning independent school in Massachusetts.

Traditions
Every member of the school signs a book, located in The Little Red School House, upon arrival.  This tradition dates back to the school's early years under the first Headmaster, Samuel Moody. After commencement, every member of the graduating class jumps over the mansion house wall.

Notable alumni

Wentworth Cheswell (1765), the first African American elected to public office in the United States
Theophilus Parsons (1765), Chief Justice of Massachusetts
Eliphalet Pearson (1769), first headmaster of Phillips Academy Andover, interim President of Harvard University, 1804-1806
Samuel Phillips, Jr. (1771), founder of Phillips Andover
Samuel Tenney, scholar, judge, physician/surgeon who treated wounded at the Battle of Bunker Hill, attached to the 1st Rhode Island Regiment, encamped at Valley Forge, PA, designated acting Surgeon General of the Army by General Washington, delegate to New Hampshire's Constitutional Convention, U.S. congressman
Samuel Sewall (congressman) (1772), U.S. congressman, Chief Justice of Massachusetts
Rufus King (1773) delegate to Constitutional Convention, United States Senator and 1816 Federalist candidate for President
Samuel Osgood (1776), first U.S. Postmaster, Speaker New York State Assembly; first President, City Bank of New York
Edward Preble (1776), U.S. Naval officer during Revolutionary War and thereafter, commanded USS Constitution during war with Barbary Pirates
Tobias Lear (1779), personal secretary to George Washington
Benjamin Pickman, Jr. (1780), Massachusetts state legislator, U.S. congressman
Sir David Ochterlony, American "Tory" officer in the British Army who served in India from 1777 until his death in 1825, rising to the rank of general while helping to consolidate British colonial rule there
Joseph Willard, President of Harvard University (1781–1804)
Samuel Webber, President of Harvard University (1806–1810)
Parker Cleaveland (1795), professor of mineralogy at Bowdoin College, leading early American authority on this subject, known as the "Father of American Mineralogy"
Frederick W. Lander, Brig. Gen. USA, killed in action during the Civil War
Reuben D. Mussey, Jr. (1846), Brig. Gen. USA, later private secretary to President Andrew Johnson, professor at Howard University Law School; he married Ellen Spencer Mussey, who became one of the first female attorneys in the District of Columbia and who was leading suffragist.  She also became a founder of the Washington College of Law.
John W. Candler, member of Congress from Massachusetts during the 1880s
Benjamin Perley Poore, journalist, newspaper editor and founder of the Gridiron Club
Yu Kil-chun, Korean reformist and the first Korean to study in the West, entered the school in 1884
Frank Crowe (1901), civil engineer and dam builder (Hoover Dam, Shasta Dam)
William Summer Johnson (1932), professor of chemistry at Stanford who was awarded the National Medal of Science
Benjamin A. Smith II (1935), U.S. senator from Massachusetts, 1960–62
Joe Hoague (1937), professional football player, Pittsburgh Steelers
Ted Bergmann, American TV and film producer and screenwriter
Niles Perkins (1938), athlete and physician
Dodge Morgan (1950), the first American to sail solo around the globe with no stops (1986)
Michael Stonebraker (1961) Receiver of the ACM Turing Award also referred to as the "Nobel Prize of Computing"
Jeb Bradley (1970), U.S. congressman, 2003–2007; New Hampshire state senator 2009-
Steve Bucknall (1985), professional basketball player, LA Lakers 
Carrie Walton Penner (1988), Walton Family, Charter School Growth Fund
Dan Gadzuric (1998), professional basketball player, Golden State Warriors
Nat Baldwin (1999), bassist and singer, member of Dirty Projectors 
Song, Chang-il (2000), known by his stage name Double K, a South Korean rapper 
Derek Falvey (2001), Executive Vice President and Chief Baseball Officer for the Minnesota Twins of Major League Baseball (MLB)
Didit Hediprasetyo (2001), fashion designer
Benn Ferriero (2004), former professional ice hockey player for the San Jose Sharks
Robert Francois (2004), professional football player, Minnesota Vikings, Detroit Lions, Green Bay Packers, Super Bowl champion 2010-11
Alexandra Carpenter (2011), Olympic women's hockey player
Duncan Robinson (2012), professional basketball player, Miami Heat
Jake Picking (2010), American actor
Matt Peart (2015), professional football player for the New York Giants of the NFL

References

Further reading

External links

The Governor's Academy on Instagram. Archived from the original on ghostarchive.org

1763 establishments in Massachusetts
Boarding schools in Massachusetts
Educational institutions established in 1763
Independent School League
Newbury, Massachusetts
Private boarding schools in the United States
Private high schools in Massachusetts
Private preparatory schools in Massachusetts
Schools in Essex County, Massachusetts